Pseudovates is a genus of praying mantis in the family Mantidae. There are more than 20 described species in the genus Pseudovates, and are found in North, Central, and South America.

Species
These 22 species belong to the genus Pseudovates:

 Pseudovates arizonae Hebard, 1935 (Arizona unicorn mantis)
 Pseudovates bidens Fabricius, 1775
 Pseudovates brasiliensis Toledo Piza, 1982
 Pseudovates brevicollis (Orofino, Ippolito & Lombardo, 2006)
 Pseudovates brevicornis Stal, 1877
 Pseudovates chlorophaea Blanchard, 1836
 Pseudovates cingulata Drury, 1773
 Pseudovates cornuta Saussure & Zehntner, 1894
 Pseudovates denticulata Saussure, 1870
 Pseudovates gracilicollis (Orofino, Ippolito & Lombardo, 2006)
 Pseudovates hofmanni Saussure & Zehntner, 1894
 Pseudovates iheringi Saussure & Zehntner, 1894
 Pseudovates longicollis Stal, 1877
 Pseudovates minor Saussure, 1872
 Pseudovates paraensis Saussure, 1871
 Pseudovates parallela de Haan, 1842
 Pseudovates parvula Westwood, 1889
 Pseudovates spinicollis Saussure & Zehntner, 1894
 Pseudovates stolli (Saussure & Zehntner, 1894)
 Pseudovates tolteca Saussure, 1859
 Pseudovates townsendi Rehn, 1904
 Pseudovates tripunctata Burmeister, 1838

References

Further reading

 
 
 

Mantidae
Mantodea genera